Lozorno is a village and municipality in western Slovakia in  Malacky District in the Bratislava region.
Lozorno lies near the western slopes of the Small Carpathians in the southern Záhorská lowlands. In the center of the village is the Church of St. Catherine of Alexandria, which dates from 1629. The village is also home to old monument statues of St. Florian and St. John of Nepomuk.

Above the village there is a lake which emerges from a "Dry Creek" through the village. Every year Lozorno residents or neighbors from surrounding villages gather to engage in fishing pursuits. Above this water reservoir is a trail that leads through the Little Carpathians in Košariská, which belongs to the municipality.
 
Lozorno has several restaurants and pubs as well as a three-star hotel that provides accommodation and restaurant services.

Sport in Lozorno
Lozorno has a golf course, sometimes used by citizens of Bratislava, as well as tennis courts.
Football in Lozorno is represented by ŠK Lozorno football club, based at the local football stadium with a capacity of 850 people. The team plays in the western division of the 3rd Slovak Football league. The club has prep, junior and men squads. 
Lozorno is also known for the local hockey team Lozorski Orli (Lozorno Eagles), playing in Bratislava's local hockey ball league. The hockey ball stadium has a capacity of 150 and is located in the football stadium complex.

There is also a shooting range in Lozorno, mostly used by shooting clubs and individuals for sport shooting, but also for entertainment shooting and even as a training centre for police forces.

Notable people
 Anton Tkáč, track cyclist
 Tomáš Zeman, football player
 Bruno Sirota, football player
 Samuel Foltyn, football player
 Slavko Kováč, football player
 Peťo Báli, tourist

References

External links
 http://www.lozorno.sk {Official site}
 Website of hockey-ball team Lozorski Orli 
 Website of Lozorno golf course
 Website of shooting range in Lozorno

Villages and municipalities in Malacky District